Phytoecia asiatica is a species of beetle in the family Cerambycidae. It was described by Maurice Pic in 1892. It is known from Turkey and Armenia.

Subspecies
 Phytoecia asiatica sublineata Holzschuh, 1984
 Phytoecia asiatica asiatica Pic, 1892

References

Phytoecia
Beetles described in 1892